Finland competed at the 2011 World Championships in Athletics from August 27 to September 4 in Daegu, South Korea.

Team selection

A team of 17 athletes (including 4 reserves) was announced to represent the country in the event, the country's smallest ever squad in the Championship's history.
The team was led by javelin thrower Tero Pitkämäki.
Pole vaulter Minna Nikkanen withdrew due to injury.

The following athletes (reserves) appeared on the preliminary Entry List, but not on the Official Start List of the specific event, resulting in total number of 13 competitors:

Results

Men

Women

References

External links
Official local organising committee website
Official IAAF competition website

Nations at the 2011 World Championships in Athletics
World Championships in Athletics
2011